Lucien Boekmans (born 14 December 1922, date of death unknown) was a Belgian field hockey player. He competed in the men's tournament at the 1948 Summer Olympics.

References

External links
 

1922 births
Year of death missing
Belgian male field hockey players
Olympic field hockey players of Belgium
Field hockey players at the 1948 Summer Olympics
People from Ixelles
Field hockey players from Brussels